Emmersbæk railway halt (previously Terpet railway halt) is a railway halt serving the southern part of the town of Hirtshals in Vendsyssel, Denmark.

The halt is located on the Hirtshals Line from Hirtshals to Hjørring. It opened in 1925. The train services are currently operated by Nordjyske Jernbaner which run frequent local train services between Hirtshals and Hjørring with onward connections from Hjørring to the rest of Denmark.

History 

The halt opened as Terpet railway halt in 1925 when the railway line opened.

Operations 
The train services are currently operated by Nordjyske Jernbaner which run frequent local train services between Hirtshals and Hjørring with onward connections from Hjørring to the rest of Denmark.

See also
 List of railway stations in Denmark

References

Notes

Bibliography

External links

 Nordjyske Jernbaner – Danish railway company operating in North Jutland Region
 Danske Jernbaner – website with information on railway history in Denmark
 Nordjyllands Jernbaner – website with information on railway history in North Jutland

Hirtshals
Railway stations in the North Jutland Region
Railway stations opened in 1925
1925 establishments in Denmark
Railway stations in Denmark opened in the 20th century